Chlorodiisopropylphosphine is an organophosphorus compound with the formula [(CH3)2CH]2PCl. It is a colorless liquid that reacts with water and oxygen. The compound is used to prepare tertiary phosphines  and phosphinite ligands.

Synthesis and reactions
The compound is prepared by treating phosphorus trichloride with the Grignard reagent isopropylmagnesium chloride:
PCl3  +  2 (CH3)2CHMgCl   →   [(CH3)2CH]2PCl  +  2 MgCl2
Relative to the reaction of less hindered Grignard reagents with PCl3, this reaction affords a superior yield of the monochloro derivative.

Chlorodiisopropylphosphine reacts with Grignard reagents and organolithium compounds to give phosphines:
 [(CH3)2CH]2PCl  +  RM   →    [(CH3)2CH]2PR  +  MCl

Chlorodiisopropylphosphine reacts with alcohols and phenols to give phosphinites, this reaction typically is conducted in the presence of a base:
 [(CH3)2CH]2PCl  +  ROH   →    [(CH3)2CH]2POR  +  HCl
Phosphinites are versatile ligands.

References 

Phosphines
Isopropyl compounds